Bourgoinia is a genus of beetles in the family Buprestidae, containing the following species:

 Bourgoinia achardi Obenberger, 1926
 Bourgoinia murzini Kalashian, 1993
 Bourgoinia obscurivirida Bellamy, 1990

References

Buprestidae genera